Kampf or Kaempf may refer to:

 Arthur Kampf (1864–1950), German painter; (de)
 David Kämpf (born 1995), Czech ice hockey player
 Dietrich Kampf (born 1953), former East German ski jumper
 Edward S. Kampf (1900–1971), American federal judge
 Johannes Kaempf (1842–1918, Berlin), German politician banker; (de)
 Lars Kampf (born 1978), German football player; (de)
 Laura Kampf (born 1983), German YouTuber, designer, and craftswoman
 Max Kämpf (1912–1982), Swiss painter
 Paul Kämpf (1885–1953), German publicist; (de)
 Paul Müller-Kaempff (1861–1941), German painter and lithographer
 Saul Isaac Kaempf (1818–1892), Austrian rabbi and Orientalist
 Serge Kampf (born 1934), French businessman
 Sieghard-Carsten Kampf (born 1942), German politician; (de)
 Warren Kampf, American politician and attorney

See also 
 Kampf (disambiguation)
 Kempf (surname)
 Kempf (disambiguation)

German-language surnames

de:Kämpf